Pengbu is a transfer station on Line 1 and Line 4 of the Hangzhou Metro in China. It was opened in November 2012, together with the rest of the stations on Line 1. It is located in the Jianggan District of Hangzhou. This station offers cross-platform interchange.

Station Layout

References

Railway stations in Zhejiang
Railway stations in China opened in 2012
Hangzhou Metro stations